The Synagogue of the Priests of Djirt (Hebrew Beit Knesset Kohanim HaDintreisa) is a synagogue located in Hara Kbira "Greater Neighborhood", the Jewish neighbourhood located on the outskirts of Houmt El Souk, on the Tunisian island of Djerba.

It is named after the ancient Jewish village of Djirt, modern day er-Riadh, also known as Hara Sghira "Smaller Neighborhood”, which is located a few miles south of Houmt El Souk. According to tradition, it was in this village where the first Jews, members of the kohanim who were exiled from Jerusalem at the time of the destruction of Solomon's Temple in Jerusalem, settled. The inside is lavishly covered with decorative coloured tiles.

The synagogue is to be distinguished from the El Ghriba synagogue. El Ghriba's founding is also traced to the flight of priests from the destruction of the Second Temple during the Siege of Jerusalem (70 CE). Legend tells that they brought with them a door of the Temple, which is covered over in a wall of the synagogue.

See also
List of synagogues in Tunisia
History of the Jews in Tunisia

References

Orthodox Judaism in North Africa
Orthodox synagogues in Tunisia
Sephardi Jewish culture in North Africa
Sephardi synagogues
Djerba